The Prime Minister of the Socialist Republic of Vietnam, known as Chairman of the Council of Ministers (Vietnamese: Chủ tịch Hội đồng Bộ trưởng) from 1981 to 1992, is the highest office within the Central Government. The prime minister is simultaneously the Secretary of the Government Caucus Commission, a Party organ on government affairs, and Deputy Chairman of the Council for Defence and Security, an organ of the National Assembly. Throughout its history, the office has been responsible, at least in theory but not always in practice, for handling Vietnam's internal policies. Since Vietnam is a one-party state, with the Communist Party of Vietnam being the sole party allowed by the constitution, all the prime ministers of the Democratic Republic and the Socialist Republic have been members of the party while holding office. The current prime minister is Phạm Minh Chính, since 5 April 2021. He is sixth-ranked in the Political Bureau (Politburo).

The Office of the Prime Minister of the Socialist Republic traces its lineage back to Hồ Chí Minh, the first Prime Minister of the Democratic Republic. The office has no official connection, or lineage, to the heads of government of the former South Vietnam (with the exception of Huỳnh Tấn Phát, a communist and the last head of government of South Vietnam). Officially there have been 8 prime ministers of Vietnam, but there have been 29 prime ministers of Vietnam if the prime ministers of the Empire of Vietnam and South Vietnam are counted.

The Prime Minister is elected by the proposal of the President of Vietnam to the National Assembly and is responsible to the National Assembly, which elects all ministers to government. Activity reports by the Prime Minister must be given to the National Assembly, while the Standing Committee of the National Assembly supervises the activities of the Central Government and the Prime Minister. Finally, the deputies of the National Assembly have the right to question the Prime Minister and other members of government.

Legends

Empire of Vietnam (1945)

Democratic Republic of Vietnam (1945–76)
Status

State of Vietnam and Republic of Vietnam (1949–1975)

Vietnam (1976–present)

Socialist Republic of Vietnam (1976–present)
Status

See also
 List of presidents of Vietnam
 List of heads of government of Vietnam
 Leaders of South Vietnam

Notes
1. The Politburo of the Central Committee is the highest decision-making body of the CPV and the Central Government. The membership composition, and the order of rank of the individual Politburo members is decided in an election within the newly formed Central Committee in the aftermath of a Party Congress. The Central Committee can overrule the Politburo, but that does not happen often.
2. These numbers are official. The "—" denotes acting head of government. The first column shows how many heads of government there have been in Vietnamese history, while the second show how many heads of government there was in that state.
3. The Central Committee when it convenes for its first session after being elected by a National Party Congress elects the Politburo. According to David Koh, in interviews with several high-standing Vietnamese officials, the Politburo ranking is based upon the number of approval votes by the Central Committee. Lê Hồng Anh, the Minister of Public Security, was ranked 2nd in the 10th Politburo because he received the second-highest number of approval votes. Another example being Tô Huy Rứa of the 10th Politburo, he was ranked lowest because he received the lowest approval vote of the 10th Central Committee when he was standing for election for a seat in the Politburo. This system was implemented at the 1st plenum of the 10th Central Committee. The Politburo ranking functioned as an official order of precedence before the 10th Party Congress, and some believe it still does.
4. Phạm Văn Đồng became 4th-ranked member in the Politburo hierarchy when Hồ Chí Minh, the 1st ranked, died in 1969.
5. Phạm Văn Đồng was ranked 2nd in the Politburo hierarchy when Lê Duẩn, the General Secretary of the Central Committee, died on 10 July 1986.
6. Died in office.

References
General
The prime ministers, and when they took and left office, was taken from these sources:
  
  
Specific

Bibliography

External links

Vietnam
Prime Ministers